The Calipuy National Reservation is located in La Libertad. Its main purpose is to protect the guanaco’s populations.

See also 
 Calipuy National Sanctuary

References

National Reservations of Peru
Geography of La Libertad Region